Gunnar Dahl-Olsen (born 12 January 1965) is a Faroese road cyclist, who is a multiple time national road and time trial champion.

Major results

1992
 2nd National Time Trial Championships
1995
 2nd Road race, Island Games
1996
 3rd National Road Race Championships
 3rd National Time Trial Championships
1997
 3rd National Road Race Championships
 3rd Overall Tour of Faroe Islands
1st Stage 4
1998
 2nd National Road Race Championships
 2nd National Time Trial Championships
 2nd Overall Tour of Faroe Islands
1st Stage 1
1999
 2nd National Road Race Championships
 2nd National Time Trial Championships
2000
 1st  National Road Race Championships
 3rd National Time Trial Championships
 3rd Overall Tour of Faroe Islands
1st Stage 4
2001
 1st  National Road Race Championships
 1st  National Time Trial Championships
 3rd Overall Tour of Faroe Islands
2002
 1st  National Road Race Championships
 1st  National Time Trial Championships
2003
 1st  National Road Race Championships
 1st  National Time Trial Championships
 3rd Road race, Island Games
 3rd Overall Tour of Faroe Islands
1st Stage 3
2004
 1st  National Road Race Championships
 1st  National Time Trial Championships
 2nd Overall Tour of Faroe Islands
1st Stage 1
2005
 1st  National Road Race Championships
 1st  National Time Trial Championships
 2nd Overall Tour of Faroe Islands
1st Prologue & Stage 2
2006
 2nd Overall Tour of Faroe Islands
1st Stage 4
2008
 1st  National Road Race Championships
 3rd National Time Trial Championships
2009
 2nd National Road Race Championships
 2nd National Time Trial Championships
2010
 1st Stage 4 Tour of Faroe Islands
2011
 1st  National Time Trial Championships
 3rd Overall Tour of Faroe Islands
1st Stage 4
2012
 2nd National Road Race Championships
 2nd National Time Trial Championships
 3rd Overall Tour of Faroe Islands
2013
 1st  National Road Race Championships
 2nd National Time Trial Championships
2014
 1st  National Road Race Championships
 1st  National Time Trial Championships
2015
 2nd National Road Race Championships
 2nd National Time Trial Championships
2016
 1st  National Road Race Championships
 1st  National Time Trial Championships
2017
 3rd National Time Trial Championships

References

External links 

1965 births
Living people
Faroese male cyclists
Danish male cyclists